Indumati Paingankar ( Sheth), better known as Kanan Kaushal, is an Indian actress, most famous for starring in Jai Santoshi Maa (1975) and Pardesi. The low-budget film became a huge box office hit and a cultural phenomenon. She has acted in number of Marathi films like Pahuni, Bholi Bhabadi, Maan Apmaan, Ekati, Kartiki, Mama Bhache, Chandra Aahe Sakshila, LaxmanRekha and Shraddha.  She has also acted in 16 Gujarati films, 4 Bhojpuri films, and 60 Hindi – Marathi films. She belongs to the "Gomantak Maratha" community and has acted in a number of Marathi plays.

Filmography

References

External links

Actresses from Gujarat
Living people
Actresses in Marathi cinema
Actresses in Hindi cinema
20th-century Indian actresses
People from Vadodara
Actresses in Gujarati cinema
Actresses in Bhojpuri cinema
Indian stage actresses
Indian film actresses
Year of birth missing (living people)